Vladislav Fedotov (born 8 February 1997) is a Belarusian professional footballer who plays for Molodechno.

References

External links
 
 

1997 births
Living people
Belarusian footballers
Association football midfielders
FC Molodechno players
FC Isloch Minsk Raion players
FC Lida players
FC Chist players